The 2021 Giants Live Arnold Strongman UK was a strongman competition that took place in Birmingham, England on the 3rd October 2021 at the National Exhibition Centre. This event was part of the 2021 Giants live tour and the first ever Arnold Sports Festival in the UK..

Results of events

Event 1: Hercules Hold
 Athlete must stand between and hold on to 160 kilograms (350 lb) pillars for as long as possible.

^ Luke Stoltman sustained an injury in this event and took no further part in the competition.

Event 2: Frame Carry
  frame carry over a  course.

^ Tom Stoltman sustained an injury in this event and took no further part in the competition.

Event 3: Deadlift
Weight:  for as many repetitions as possible.
Time Limit: 60 seconds
Notes: This event was completed on an axle bar.

Event 4: Dumbell Press
Weight: 100 kilograms (220 lb) for as many repetitions as possible.
Time Limit 75 seconds.

^ Pa O'Dwyer sustained an injury in this event and took no further part in the competition.

Event 5: Atlas Stones

Final Results

References

Competitions in the United Kingdom
Giants Live competitions